HD 174387 (HR 7092) is a solitary star in the southern constellation Telescopium. With an apparent magnitude of 5.49, it is faintly visible to the naked eye if viewed under dark skies.

HD 174387 has a stellar classification of M0 III, indicating that it is an ageing red giant. HD 174387's metallicity is estimated to be 91% that of the Sun. The star is suspected to be variable, ranging from magnitudes 5.59 to 5.63 in the Hipparcos passband.

References

Telescopium (constellation)
M-type giants
Suspected variables
Telescopii, 33
CD-46 12669
174387
092630
7092